Benjamin Michael Hanley is a British racing driver who was a part of Renault F1 Team's Renault Driver Development Program from 2006 to 2008. He raced two seasons part time in the NTT IndyCar Series. Currently he is racing in the FIA World Endurance Championship, European Le Mans Series, and the IMSA WeatherTech SportsCar Championship with Dragonspeed Racing.

Career
Hanley had a successful career in karting, winning a number of championships and individual races and coming close to winning the Karting World Championship. He made his debut in Single-seater cars in the 2005 Formula Renault 2.0 Italia series, and finished 3rd driving for Cram Competition. He then raced in the Formula Renault 3.5 Series in 2006 and in 2007 he finished as runner-up in the championship, driving for Prema Powerteam. He was signed to drive for Campos Racing in early 2008, partnering Vitaly Petrov.  He also joined the team for the second round of the 2008 GP2 Asia Series, scoring a podium finish in his first GP2 race.  After three races of the season Hanley and Campos parted company, but he secured a drive with Durango before the next race. He replaced Marcello Puglisi, who was in turn deputising for the injured Davide Valsecchi.  However, this was only a one-off drive, as Valsecchi returned to racing action at the next round of the championship. He began 2009 without a drive, but joined the Euroseries 3000 mid-season and won during his first event in the category. He also returned to karting in 2009, finishing third in the Karting World Championship.

IndyCar
On December 17, 2018, it was announced that Hanley would compete in 5 IndyCar races, including the 103rd Indianapolis 500, with DragonSpeed in 2019. Only three of those races were fulfilled because of visa issues, and he could not compete in the Championship beyond the Indianapolis 500. The No. 81 qualified 27th and then Finished 32nd in the race after a mechanical issue. 

In January 2020 it was confirmed that he would return with Dragonspeed. The team planned to enter 6 races, but due to the COVID-19 pandemic the St. Petersburg, Long Beach, Mid-Ohio and Laguna Seca races were cancelled, and the team did not field an entry for Texas. On August 8, the team announced that Hanley would drive their entry for the Indianapolis 500, which was held on August 23. With little preparation time, the team had numerous mechanical issues in practice, resulting in qualifying in the 33rd and last position. The car finished the race in 23rd place. 

On October 28, 2020 the team shuttered their IndyCar Series program and sold their IndyCar assets to Meyer Shank Racing, citing the team "being taken back two years" due to the COVID-19 pandemic. Team Owner Elton Julian left open the possibility of returning to the series when "the next big thing happens for IndyCar" if the resources were available.

Racing record

Career summary

† As Hanley was a guest driver, he was ineligible to score points.
‡ Points only counted towards the Michelin Endurance Cup, and not the overall LMP2 Championship.

Complete Formula Renault 3.5 Series results
(key) (Races in bold indicate pole position; results in italics indicate fastest lap)

Complete GP2 Series results
(key) (Races in bold indicate pole position; results in italics indicate fastest lap)

Complete GP2 Asia Series results
(key) (Races in bold indicate pole position; results in italics indicate fastest lap)

Superleague Formula
(key) (Races in bold indicate pole position; results in italics indicate fastest lap)

† Non-championship event.

Complete European Le Mans Series results
(key) (Races in bold indicate pole position; results in italics indicate fastest lap)

‡ Half points awarded as less than 75% of race distance was completed.

Complete IMSA SportsCar Championship results
(key) (Races in bold indicate pole position; results in italics indicate fastest lap)

† Points only counted towards the Michelin Endurance Cup, and not the overall LMP2 Championship.

Complete FIA World Endurance Championship results
(key) (Races in bold indicate pole position; results in italics indicate fastest lap)

† Not eligible for points.

Complete 24 Hours of Le Mans results

American open-wheel racing results
(key)

IndyCar Series
(key)

Indianapolis 500

References

External links
Ben Hanley official website

1985 births
Living people
English racing drivers
GP2 Series drivers
GP2 Asia Series drivers
IndyCar Series drivers
Auto GP drivers
Olympiacos CFP (Superleague Formula team) drivers
Formula Renault Eurocup drivers
British Formula Renault 2.0 drivers
Karting World Championship drivers
World Series Formula V8 3.5 drivers
24 Hours of Daytona drivers
24 Hours of Le Mans drivers
Indianapolis 500 drivers
Prema Powerteam drivers
Campos Racing drivers
DragonSpeed drivers
G-Drive Racing drivers
Manor Motorsport drivers
Racing Engineering drivers
European Le Mans Series drivers
Asian Le Mans Series drivers
Cram Competition drivers
WeatherTech SportsCar Championship drivers
Durango drivers
CRS Racing drivers
TDS Racing drivers
Scuderia Coloni drivers
United Autosports drivers
FIA World Endurance Championship drivers